The 1900 Tasmanian colonial election was held on 9 March 1900 in the Australian colony of Tasmania to elect 38 members of the Tasmanian House of Assembly.

Results

See also
Members of the Tasmanian House of Assembly, 1900–1903

References

1900
1900 elections in Australia
1900s in Tasmania
19th century in Tasmania